Melieria limpidipennis is a species of ulidiid or picture-winged fly in the genus Melieria of the family Ulidiidae.

References

External links
 
 
 

limpidipennis
Taxa named by Theodor Becker
Insects described in 1907